{{Infobox writer 
| name          =  Jen Hadfield
| image         = Jen-Hadfield-001.jpg
| image_size    = 150px 
| caption       =Jen-Hadfield-001
| birth_date    = 
| birth_place   = Cheshire, England
| death_date    =
| death_place   =
| resting_place =
| occupation    = Poet, Visual Artist
| language      =
| nationality       =
| citizenship   =
| education     =
| alma_mater    = University of Edinburgh University of Glasgow
| period        =
| genre         =
| subject       = 
| movement      =
| notableworks  = Nigh-No-Place, Almanacs
| spouse        = 
| partner       =
| awards        = T.S. Eliot Prize Eric Gregory Award
| signature     =
| signature_alt =
| portaldisp    =
}}

Jen Hadfield (born 1978) is a British poet and visual artist. 
She has published four poetry collections. Her first collection, Almanacs, won an Eric Gregory Award in 2003. Hadfield is the youngest female poet to be awarded the TS Eliot Prize, with her second collection, Nigh-No-Place, in 2008. Her fourth collection, The Stone Age, was selected as the Poetry Book Society choice for spring 2021 and won the Highland Book Prize, 2021.

Hadfield's poems and visual art are based on her experience of living, working and traveling in Shetland and the Outer Hebrides of Scotland, and Canada. In her work as an artist, she often uses found objects, salvage materials and ocean detritus.

Themes in Hadfield's poems include home and belonging, wildness and subsistence, landscape and language, and the Shetland dialect.

 Biography
Jen Hadfield was born in 1978 to a Canadian mother and a British father. She grew up in Cheshire, England. She obtained a BA in English Language and Literature from the University of Edinburgh. Later, she was awarded a joint creative writing MLitt (with Distinction) from the Universities of Glasgow and Strathclyde.

Hadfield has worked as a professional poet since 2002. In 2003, she won the Eric Gregory Award, which enabled a year of travel and writing in Canada. Her first collection, Almanacs (Bloodaxe Books, 2005) was written in Shetland and the Western Isles in 2002, thanks to a bursary from the Scottish Arts Council. Her second collection, Nigh–No–Place (Bloodaxe Books, 2008), inspired by her travels in Shetland and Canada, was awarded the T.S. Eliot Prize in 2008. Hadfield was winner of the Edwin Morgan International Poetry Award in 2012. and selected in 2014 as one of "Next Generation Poets", a promotion organised by the Poetry Book Society. Other honours include the Scottish Arts Council Bursary Award, and residencies with the Shetland Arts Trust and the Scottish Poetry Library.

Making artists' books has been an integral component of Hadfield's work. She partnered with printer Ursula Freeman of Redlake Press on The Printer’s Devil and the Little Bear (2006), a limited edition handmade book that combined traditional letterpress techniques and laserprint. The book is illustrated with Hadfield's photographs of Canada.

In 2007, a Dewar Award enabled Hadfield to travel in Mexico and research Mexican devotional folk art. She "created a solo exhibition of 'Shetland ex-votos in the style of sacred Mexican folk art' – tiny, portable, insistently familiar landscapes packed in an array of weathered tobacco tins."

Hadfield lives in Shetland, where she works as a poet and writing tutor.

 Poetry collectionsThe Stone Age (Picador, 2021)Byssus (Picador, 2014)Nigh–No–Place (Bloodaxe Books, 2008)Almanacs (Bloodaxe Books, 2005)

References

External links
 http://www.redlakevalleyartists.co.uk/freeman.htm
Poetry Archive profile and poems written and audio 
"TS Eliot judge Tobias Hill on the noteworthy Jen Hadfield" by Tobias Hill 14 January 2009  Guardian''

1978 births
Living people
21st-century British poets
21st-century English women writers
Alumni of the University of Edinburgh
Alumni of the University of Glasgow
English women poets
People from Cheshire
T. S. Eliot Prize winners
People associated with Shetland